The Egg Cracker Suite is a 1943 Easter-themed animated short produced by Walter Lantz, co-directed by Ben Hardaway and Emery Hawkins (also he was a character designer) and animated by Les Kline (solely credited as Lester Kline), Laverne Harding and Paul J. Smith (both uncredited) that features a redesigned Oswald the Lucky Rabbit.  This is the last animated short to feature Oswald until Get a Horse! in 2013.

Plot 
Oswald leads a line of rabbits, anchored by a small brown bunny, into Bunnyville, where they are to ready Easter baskets for the holiday. He enters one tree, which is a hen house dubbed "Egg Plant No. 1", and conducts them in a symphony to get them to lay eggs. Outside, each rabbit in the line gets an egg. Oswald finishes the symphony getting the lone ostrich to lay her huge egg, which as luck would have it, the small brown bunny winds up with.

The rest of the cartoon involves the creation of the Easter baskets. First one rabbit hard boils the eggs, only to find one spoiled and rings for it to be taken away by the health department truck. The next scene shows rabbits making egg dye with plant and flower leaves. In the next scene, one rabbit is painting designs on eggs, but one egg hatches as he's painting it and he winds up painting the chick instead, who takes exception to it, causing the chick to yell in a fast chipmunk voice, and paints the rabbits face in retaliation.

The next scene is the second one involving the small brown bunny with the ostrich egg. He's just happily pushing it along to a huge vat of egg dye. He pushes it up the plank, but can't quite push it over, so he runs back to get a head start but the egg falls in the vat and the plank falls down before hand and he crashes into the side of the vat.

Next, rabbits are carrying baskets on wheelbarrows to first be filled with grass, then one egg surrounded by candy eggs, then each topped with a blue bow. They then take them to Bunnyville Airport where they're loaded into planes resembling B-18 bombers. As they ready for takeoff, the small brown bunny is shown running with the ostrich egg towards a plane, but the egg hatches before he can get there and the newborn ostrich that came out picks him up and throws him into a plane.

The planes take off one by one and are seen flying in formation when they open their bomb bay doors and drop the baskets all over the country. The bows open up like parachutes to slow their fall. The final scene is an apparently empty basket falling, but the brown bunny pops up and looks down initially horrified, but then his bow opens up and he relaxes then he waves to all of the viewers as the cartoon ends.

See also 
 Funny Little Bunnies

References

External links 
 
 
 Full cartoon at YouTube

1943 films
1943 animated films
1940s American animated films
1940s animated short films
Oswald the Lucky Rabbit cartoons
Walter Lantz Productions shorts
Universal Pictures animated short films
Films directed by Ben Hardaway
Films about Easter
Animated films about animals